Raginnis is a hamlet near Mousehole in west Cornwall, England, United Kingdom.

References

Hamlets in Cornwall
Penwith